Bagrevand (also spelled Bagrewand) was a region of Armenia.

The Old Iranian etymology of the name is disputed. It is either derived from *bāγa.raivanta ("rhubarb garden") or baga-raēvanta-, which either means "the rich giver" (Mithra) or "the bounteous God" (Ahura Mazda).

History 
It was ruled first by Mamikonians and then, in IX-XI centuries, by the Bagratuni family,.

It also had its own diocese, whose bishops probably included the theologian Yeznik of Kolb.

See also 
 List of regions of old Armenia
 Battle of Bagrevand
 Bagdasarian

References

Sources
 

Early medieval Armenian regions